Gandhipuram is a major place of the  Coimbatore city in Tamil Nadu, India. It is presently named after Mahatma Gandhi. It was previously known as "Katoor".

Gandhipuram evolved as the major public transportation hub after the construction of the central bus terminus of the city in 1974. Nanjappa Road is an arterial road in the city which passes through the nerve centre of Gandhipuram. Other arterial roads are Crosscut road, 100 feet road, Bharathiar road and Sathy Road. Gandhipuram has evolved also as one of the important commercial centres in the city with locations such as Cross Cut Road and 100 Feet Road.

Geography
In the 19th century, the Panankattu lake was filled up and then modern-day settlements such as Gandhipuram, Katoor and Ramnagar evolved.. It is located about 3.3 km from Townhall, the core of the city, 12 km from Coimbatore Integrated Bus Terminus, 11 km from the Coimbatore International Airport and about 4 km from City railway station, 3 km from Coimbatore North Junction and 10 km from Podanur Junction railway station and is well connected to local bus services to various parts of the city. Gandhipuram shares a border with Ganapathy, Ram Nagar, Tatabad, Sivananda Colony, Rathinapuri, Sidhapudur and PN Palayam.

Gandhipuram Flyover
A two-tier flyover was opened in Gandhipuram to avoid traffic congestion.

Economy
Gandhipuram is one of the major commercial centers in Coimbatore. Many industries in and around Coimbatore operate their corporate offices from Gandhipuram. Cross Cut Road and 100 Feet Road in Gandhipuram is one of the major shopping areas in Coimbatore city.

Infrastructure
Coimbatore district central jail is in located in Gandhipuram. To ease the traffic congestion, a two-tier flyover is being constructed at a cost of ₹168 crore. The largest stadium of the city, Nehru Stadium, is about 3 km from Gandhipuram. While there are several gardens and park in Coimbatore City, the largest garden and play area is VOC park and zoo.
History of Gandhipuram Coimbatore: A Walkthrough of the City’s Past and Present

Transport
Gandhipuram has Gandhipuram Central Bus Terminus is one of the major bus terminus in the city. It handles buses towards:
 Moffussil buses towards Erode, Tiruppur, Karur, Mettupalayam, Dharapuram, Salem, Gobichettipalayam, and Sathyamangalam.
 Buses towards other states Kerala, Karnataka, Andhra Pradesh and Puducherry

Gallery

References

Neighbourhoods in Coimbatore